Hackett Hall is a heritage listed  building, previously housing part of the State Library of Western Australia. It is now a part of the new WA Museum Boola Bardip complex in the Perth Cultural Centre, in Western Australia. The name of the Hall is related to the benefactor of The University of Western Australia, John Winthrop Hackett. 

It was located on James Street, Perth and its western end was adjacent to the southern end of Museum Street. The  Museum Street section between the former James Street and Francis Street was closed from traffic to create the Perth Cultural Centre. 

It was designated as the main building of the Library in the 1930s as the "Public Library of Western Australia in Hackett Hall".
There is a hall of the same name at The University of Western Australia.
It was photographed at the early stages as a library space. It was renovated in 1957.
It was registered as a heritage building in 1992 with the State Register of Heritage Places, and had been listed by the National Trust.

Hackett Hall is now the home of Otto, the WA Museums giant whale skeleton.

Gallery

See also
 Winthrop Hall

References 

Perth Cultural Centre
Landmarks in Perth, Western Australia
State Register of Heritage Places in the City of Perth